The Wigan-Barlow was an English automobile manufactured from 1922 until 1923. With a factory at Lowther Street and David Road Coventry, it was an unsuccessful assembled light car with 1368 cc Coventry Simplex or 1496 cc Meadows engines.

A sports model, the 11/40 with 1795 cc Meadows engine and polished aluminium bodywork was announced in 1922 but came too late to save the company from receivership in October 1922

See also
 List of car manufacturers of the United Kingdom

References
David Burgess Wise, The New Illustrated Encyclopedia of Automobiles.

Defunct motor vehicle manufacturers of England
Coventry motor companies